Kolhapur North Assembly constituency is one of the 288 Vidhan Sabha (legislative assembly) constituencies of Maharashtra state, western India. This constituency is located in Kolhapur district. It is a segment of Kolhapur (Lok Sabha constituency)

Geographical scope
The constituency comprises ward nos. 1 to 14, 17 to 22, 24 to 42, 47 to 50, 52 to 56, 59, 60, 62, 63 & 65 of Kolhapur Municipal Corporation belonging to Karvir taluka.

Members of Legislative Assembly

Election Results

2022 By-Election

2019 results

2014

References

Assembly constituencies of Kolhapur district
Assembly constituencies of Maharashtra